Southfield Football Club, occasionally referred to as Birmingham Southfield, was an English football club based in Birmingham, then in Warwickshire.

History
The club was founded by a Mr Ingram, who had been closely involved with the Calthorpe F.C. amateur club as umpire and occasional goalkeeper.  Southfield's first recorded match was against the Lily club, at Summerfield Park, Balsall Heath, in early 1881.  The club never appears to have had an enclosed and exclusive ground, playing mostly at Bournbrook, but occasionally at Calthorpe Park.  The club was a working-class amateur club, key player William Deebank being a carpenter.

The club joined the Birmingham Football Association for the 1883–84 season and promptly entered the Birmingham Senior Cup, losing 5–0 at West Bromwich Wellington in the first round.  The club's only significant run in the Senior Cup was in 1886–87, reaching the third round, albeit only thanks to a bye in the second round, having beaten Sutton Coldfield 6–2 away in the first.

In fact the club's matches were generally very low-key, twice suffering match abandonments because of a burst ball.  The club was not an opponent for the bigger Birmingham clubs in friendlies.  The club did play St George's during the latter's one season at Winson Green, but otherwise the club could only attract the second team of Small Heath Alliance and the third team of Aston Villa.

Nevertheless, the club had a high opinion of its abilities.  In October 1886, at a Birmingham FA meeting for the selection of a side to play the Sheffield Football Association, the Southfield representative nominated the entire Southfield side.  Perhaps because of the snub of not having a single player accepted for the representative side, the club entered the FA Cup the following season, despite many better-established Birmingham clubs not doing so.  

The club was drawn to play Burton Swifts away from home and lost 7–0, conceding five in the first half.  The club was described as "a fine set of fellows, but shocking bad players at football".  There was praise for the club's esprit de corps and wishes expressed that the players could use the tie to develop further.  In fact the opposite seems to have happened - the club retreated to junior football and seems to have dissolved after a 13–1 defeat at Singers in 1892.

Player death

Towards the end of the 1884–85 season, during a match against Aston Trafalgar at Bournbrook, one of the club's players, Charles Bache, suffered a knee to his thigh.  The day after he sought medical assistance, but the doctors found nothing wrong; four days later, he was admitted to hospital with acute blood poisoning, and died.  An inquest found the blood poisoning was a result of his footballing injury and it returned a verdict of accidental death.

Notable players

Billy Ollis, later of Small Heath Alliance

References

Defunct football clubs in Warwickshire
Defunct football clubs in the West Midlands (county)
Football clubs in Birmingham, West Midlands